Nemophora metallica is a moth of the family Adelidae. It is found in Europe.

Its wingspan is 15–20 mm. The moth flies from late June to August depending on the location.

The larvae feed on Knautia arvensis and Scabiosa columbaria.

Gallery

External links
 waarneming.nl 
 Lepidoptera of Belgium 
 Nemophora metallica at UKmoths

Adelidae
Moths of Europe
Moths of Asia
Taxa named by Nikolaus Poda von Neuhaus
Moths described in 1759